Norman Willoughby B. Stone (1904–1957) was an English amateur football centre forward who played in the Football League for Brentford.

Honours 
Brentford

 London Charity Fund: 1928

Career statistics

References

English footballers
English Football League players
Brentford F.C. players
Association football forwards
Corinthian F.C. players
1957 deaths
1904 births